Pink Smoke over the Vatican is a 2011 documentary film by Jules Hart about women who have been ordained as priests in the Roman Catholic Church, despite the Church regarding this as invalid. The film has won several awards including Best Female Filmmaker and Best Faith-Based Film at the Action On Film International Film Festival; Best Documentary at the Santa Fe Independent Film Festival; and the Emerging Artist Award at Beloit International Film Festival.  The film received three Accolade awards: Award of Merit for Feature Documentary; Editing and Voice-over Talent; and an Indie Award of Merit for Feature Documentary. It was also nominated at the Oaxaca Film Fest.

See also 
 Christian feminism
 Deaconess
 Episcopa Theodora
 Feminist theology
 Mariavite Church
 Roman Catholic Womenpriests
 We Are Church
 Women as theological figures
 Women in Christianity

References

External links
 
 Eye Goddess Films
 Related television interview clips
 NPR All Things Considered Female Priests Defy Catholic Church At The Altar

2011 documentary films
2011 films
Christian feminism
Criticism of the Catholic Church
Documentary films about Catholicism
Documentary films critical of Christianity
Films critical of the Catholic Church
2010s feminist films
Ordination of women and the Catholic Church
2010s English-language films